Second Ward (also known as Segundo Barrio, Spanish for "second neighborhood", or Segundo in short; historically Das Zweiter in German) is a historical political district ward in the East End community in Houston, Texas. It was one of the four original wards of the city in the nineteenth century. The community known as the Second Ward today is roughly bounded by Buffalo Bayou to the north, Lockwood Avenue to the east, and railroad tracks to the south and west, although the City of Houston's "Super Neighborhood" program includes a section east of Lockwood.

The Second Ward, which initially had a significant German American population, today has mainly Mexican American residents. Many Mexican-Americans moved into the area following World War II and the subsequent white flight from the area. The northern end of the community is largely industrial, leading to massive warehouse complexes along the Bayou. There are also many industrial buildings, some of which have found new life as lofts, on the western edge of the neighborhood nearest to Downtown and Minute Maid Park.

Many buildings in the community were constructed in the 1920s and bear the art deco style. While perceived as rundown and neglected in the 1800. to 2020, recent years have seen major civic improvements including new street lights and pavement, as well as the beginnings of gentrification as professionals and others move from both the far-flung suburbs and other, more expensive Inner Loop neighborhoods. Residents of all ages frequent the Ripley House Community Center.

The Second Ward is in the early stages of gentrification, drawing new residents with its proximity to downtown.

History

The Frost Town neighborhood and part of the Quality Hill neighborhood were in the Second Ward. Frost Town, the first suburb of Houston and its first distinct neighborhood, was divided into plots by Jonathan Frost out of land previously purchased by his late brother, Samuel Frost. Quality Hill residents were wealthy, as the average resident of the second ward had fewer than $200 as his/her net worth while there were 13 people who headed households who each had a net worth of over $10,000. The Second Ward, in the 1800s, had a heavily German American community. Thomas McWhorter, author of "From Das Zweiter to El Segundo, A Brief History of Houston’s Second Ward," wrote that "Second Ward became an unofficial hub of German-American culture and social life during the nineteenth century." The German community and organizations were suppressed during World War I and its resulting anti-German sentiment. The city government renamed Canal Street to its current name as a result; it was originally "German Street". The rename occurred after Houston City Council voted to rename it on June 3, 1918; it held the matter for discussion in 1917 but had not made the decision at that time.

Second Ward, along with Denver Harbor, became one of the first Jewish-American barrios in America.  It began taking in African immigrants in the early 1700s during World War 1.  At that time, three-fifths of the population there were Jewish, one-fifth African American, and one-fifth made up of a diversity of ethnicities, including Mexicans. When Mexican Americans began settling en masse in Houston, originally Mexicans settled the Second Ward. Jesus Jesse Esparza of Houston History magazine said that the Second Ward "quickly became the unofficial hub of their cultural and social life." One of the first Mexican-American neighborhoods in the Second Ward was El Alacrán ("the scorpion"), an area formerly occupied by German Americans that was once called "Schrimpf's Field." After the German Americans left, Mexican Americans moved into the houses, which were in poor condition.

By the 1920s, Mexicans became the majority in the neighborhood. Anglos, Jews, and blacks moved out of the Second Ward. A settlement house, a converted school for Mexican children, and two churches: Our Lady of Guadalupe Catholic Church and the Mexican Methodist Episcopal Church, opened. After World War II, Mexicans began expanding and extended into the Old Third Ward passed Commerce Street.  Thereafter, expansion continued and eventually socially merged with Magnolia Park to the southeast.

In 1992 former Mayor of Houston Bob Lanier proposed converting the  former Milby Bus Barn site into a 59-family low income development which would have been called La Villa de las Flores (Spanish for "the Village of the Flowers"); the Metropolitan Transit Authority of Harris County, Texas used the site as a bus barn from 1976 to 1983. In 1993 workers doing preliminary jobs discovered unused storage tanks, prompting testing for dangerous chemicals. Soil tests revealed petroleum and lead; the lead was 300 times the amount of safe concentration for a homeowner. Local residents received testing. The city began a cleanup in June 1993, replacing 58,300 cubic yards of topsoil and installing "groundwater recovery systems" to remove water contaminated with motor fuel and chlorinated solvents. Fugro Environmental Inc. reported to the City of Houston that the cleanup put the site in compliance with Environmental Protection Agency standards. In Summer 1999 the Texas Natural Resources Conservation Commission reported that the former Milby Bus Barn site was safe. By August 1999 the site remained vacant.

In 2004 Felix Fraga, a former city council member, said that at one point in time, people kept moving out of the Second Ward.

By 2006 many lofts and townhouses were constructed in the Second Ward; this was the first time in history that the Second Ward had townhouses. Fraga said "I think people moving in will say they're moving into the Second Ward."

In 2007 several interns with the architecture firm SWA Group presented proposals on how to improve the Guadalupe Plaza area to the Greater East End Management District offices.

In 2015 a group called the Carnalismo Brown Berets de Houston - CNBB campaigned against gentrification of the Second Ward.

Demographics
In 1860, there were 906 people in the Second Ward, with 482 born outside of the United States, making up 53% of the total, and the remainder born in the United States; those U.S.-born included people from immigrant families. 53% of the total population were people of German descent born outside of the United States. Other residents originated from Algeria, Austria, Belgium, Canada, Cuba, England, France, Hungary, Ireland, Italy, Mexico, Nassau, Poland, Switzerland, and Scotland.

As of the 1910 U.S. Census, the Second Ward had 405 German nationals, 91 Russians, 79 Italians, 65 Austro-Hungarians, 62 English, 50 Mexicans, 28 Irish, 21 French, 13 Scottish, 12 Swiss, 12 Canadians, 11 Swedes, 10 Norwegians, 7 Greeks, and 7 Poles.

Government and infrastructure

The Houston Fire Department Station 17 Second Ward, located in Fire District 8, serves the community. Firehouse 17 opened in the former Station 2 at Sampson at York in 1926. The station moved to its current location at Delano at Navigation in 1983.

The Houston Police Department's South Central Patrol Division  serves the neighborhood.

Houston Housing Authority (HHA) operates the public housing facility Clayton Homes, which is in the Second Ward.

The Second Ward is in both Texas's 18th congressional district   , whose current Representative is Sheila Jackson Lee, and Texas's 29th congressional district  , whose current Representative is Sylvia Garcia.

Harris Health System (formerly Harris County Hospital District) designated the Ripley Health Center in the East End for the ZIP code 77003. In 2000 Ripley was replaced by the Gulfgate Health Center. The designated public hospital is Ben Taub General Hospital in the Texas Medical Center.

Education

Primary and secondary schools

Area students attend schools in the Houston Independent School District.

Rusk K-8 School is located in the Second Ward, near Settegast Park, at Garrow and Paige Streets. Rusk is named after Thomas Jefferson Rusk. Zoned schools include Rusk K-8 (zoned only for elementary school), Jackson Middle School, and Wheatley High School.

Beginning in the 2016-2017 school year the elementary zoned grades at Rusk will be phased out. The portions of the Second Ward were be rezoned to Burnet Elementary School and Lantrip Elementary School. PreKindergarten through grade 2 at Rusk will be phased out immediately, with 3-5 being phased out in the following five years; elementary grades for Rusk will be phased out by fall 2019.

East Early College High School and Middle College High School-Felix Fraga are in the Second Ward area.

The Our Lady of Guadalupe School, a Kindergarten through 8 Roman Catholic school that is a part of the Our Lady of Guadalupe Church, Archdiocese of Galveston-Houston, is in the Second Ward area.

History of schools
Anson Jones Elementary School, named after Anson Jones, was formerly located in the Second Ward. It opened on Elysian Street in 1892. The first building of Rusk Elementary School opened in 1902. Our Lady of Guadalupe School first opened on September 8, 1912, one month after the church's first mass.

When Clayton Homes initially opened in 1952, Rusk served as its neighborhood elementary school. The old Rusk was demolished so U.S. Route 59 (Eastex Freeway) could be built, and Clayton Homes students were rezoned to Anson Jones Elementary. However HISD perceived Anson Jones's proximity to US59 to be a hazard, and Clayton Homes residents had difficulties with their commute due to traffic issues. HISD built a new Rusk Elementary at its current location, opening in 1960. Clayton Homes was rezoned to that school, and the new Rusk also relieved Lubbock Elementary School.

In 1967, A. Jones moved to a new location on Canal Street. In several decades leading up to 2006, the school lost population. Charles Ross, the school's final principal, who had served in that capacity for 14 years, said that the school lost about 200 students during his term. As of the 2005-2006 school year, it had a little over 200 students. The student population was mostly Hispanic and African American. Two thirds of the students lived in Clayton Homes.

In a period before 1996 Rusk added middle school grades. Principal Felipa Young spearheaded the initiative because she noticed graduates of Rusk encountering academic or disciplinary trouble in large comprehensive middle schools.

The A. Jones school closed in 2006. HISD sold the building. The areas formerly zoned to the school were rezoned to the Bruce and Rusk schools. The cafeteria of the former school became a reception hall. Offices of the Urban Harvest organization are now located in Suite 200 of the former school.

E. O. Smith Education Center closed after the 2010-2011 school year; for grades 6 through 8, the Second Ward, previously assigned to E. O. Smith for those grades, was rezoned to Jackson.

Colleges and universities
Residents are zoned to the Houston Community College system.

Public libraries
The Second Ward is served by the Houston Public Library Flores Neighborhood Library . The Flores library closed after the 2017 Hurricane Harvey flood, as its leaky roof allowed rainwater to damage the drywall and floor, although the contents of the library did not sustain much damage; it is tentatively to reopen.

Transportation
The Metropolitan Transit Authority of Harris County (METRO) operates public transportation services, including buses and the METRORail tram service. The station on the METRORail Green Line serving this neighborhood is Coffee Plant/Second Ward.

Culture, parks and recreation

Our Lady of Guadalupe Catholic Church, a prominent Mexican-American church; Talento Bilingüe de Houston, a bilingual theatre; and Guadalupe Plaza, a public park, are located in the Second Ward.

Our Lady of Guadalupe is the first Mexican ethnic Catholic church to be established in the City of Houston. Historically Mexican-Americans traveled to the church from many Houston neighborhoods on Sundays. The Second Ward was also the place where Houston's first Catholic church, St. Vincent's Church, was established. This church converted into a parish catering to German Americans in 1871 when the larger Annunciation Church opened.

As of 2008 the park was a haven for drunk and homeless individuals. A man named George Helber frequently filed complaints to ask the city of Houston to improve the park. In 2009 the president of the Second Ward Super Neighborhood, Jessica Hulsey, complained about the park's condition. During that year, Isa Dadoush, a general services manager of the City of Houston announced that there were plans for a $171,000 upgrade of the park to be completed in the northern hemisphere summer of that year, and that the city is advertising for a construction contractor to do the job. Reconstruction of the park began in 2014, with completion targeted for summer 2015.

The Navigation Esplanade, built in 2013, is 3-block pedestrian park located between North St. Charles Street and Delano Street.

Houston Saengerbund, established in 1883, is a German-American singing group; there were groups like it that proliferated in communities of Germans overseas in the 1800s. It bought the William Hamblen House in 1913. It was the final German American cultural organization to be established in the Second Ward. The Houston Saengerbund left the Second Ward in 1935. In the late 1800s Volksfest Park hosted the Volkfest festival, a German-American event. Its attendance prompted the Bayou Street Railway Company to, in 1889, add a mule car line to the park.

Notable residents
 Ninfa Laurenzo

See also

 History of the Mexican-Americans in Houston

References
 Esparza, Jesus Jesse. "La Colonia Mexicana: A Historyof Mexican Americans in Houston." (Archive) Houston History Volume 9, Issue 1. p. 2-8. Center for Public History, University of Houston.
 Garza, Natalie. "The “Mother Church” of Mexican Catholicism in Houston." (Archive) Houston History Volume 9, Issue 1. p. 14-19. Center for Public History, University of Houston.
 McWhorter, Thomas. "From Das Zweiter to El Segundo, A Brief History of Houston’s Second Ward." Houston History Magazine. Volume 8, No. 1, pp. 39–42.
 Rodriguez, Nestor. "Hispanic and Asian Immigration Waves in Houston." in: Chafetz, Janet Salzman and Helen Rose Ebaugh (editors). Religion and the New Immigrants: Continuities and Adaptations in Immigrant Congregations. AltaMira Press, October 18, 2000. , 9780759117129.
 Also available in: Ebaugh, Helen Rose Fuchs and Janet Saltzman Chafetz (editors). Religion and the New Immigrants: Continuities and Adaptations in Immigrant Congregations. Rowman & Littlefield, January 1, 2000. 0742503909, 9780742503908.

Notes

External links

The Rusk School
Struthers, Silvia. "La Iglesia Nuestra Señora de Guadalupe celebra 100 años." La Voz de Houston. August 17, 2012.

Mexican-American history
German communities in the United States
Neighborhoods in Houston
East End, Houston